The women's pole vault event  at the 1998 European Athletics Indoor Championships was held on 27 February–1 March.

Medalists

Results

Qualification
Qualification Performance: 4.10 (Q) or at least 12 best performers (q) advanced to the final.

Final

References

Qualification results
Final results

Pole vault at the European Athletics Indoor Championships
Pole
1998 in women's athletics